Nanjing County is a county under the administration of Zhangzhou City, in the south of Fujian province, People's Republic of China.

Administrative division
Nanjing County is administratively divided into several towns:
Shancheng - the county seat
Jingcheng, 
Longshan, 
Chuanchang, 
Jinshan, 
Hexi, 
Kuiyang, 
Nankeng, 
 Fengtian, 
Meilin, 
Shuyang

Sights
Nanjing County, and in particular its western part (Shuyang and Meilin Towns), is the location of many famous Fujian Tulou. Out of the 10 tulou sites listed on UNESCO's World Heritage list, four are in Nanjing County:
 Tianluokeng Tulou cluster
 Hekeng Tulou cluster (Hekeng Village), near Qujiang administrative village, Shuyang Town
 Hegui Lou
 Huaiyuan Lou

Transportation
Until 2012, Nanjing County had no railways. The Longyan–Xiamen Railway, opened on June 30, 2012, became the first railway to cross the county.

Climate

References

County-level divisions of Fujian
Zhangzhou